Pterolophia annulitarsis is a species of beetle in the family Cerambycidae. It was described by Francis Polkinghorne Pascoe in 1865. It is known from Sumatra, Borneo and Malaysia.

References

annulitarsis
Beetles described in 1865